Mežica (German: Mießdorf) is a town in northern Slovenia. It is the seat of the Municipality of Mežica. It lies on the Meža River in the traditional Slovenian province of Carinthia) near the Austrian border. The town developed close to a lead and zinc mine under Mount Peca. Mining began in 1665 and ended in 1994. Today the mine is only open for tourist visits.

The town once had a small ski area on Mount Peca, but this closed soon after the mining operations ceased to operate.

The parish church in the settlement is dedicated to Saint James. It is a single-nave building built in 1840 to replace an earlier smaller building.

References

External links
 Mežica on Geopedia
 Peca Underground, tourist mine and museum (in Slovene, English and German)
 Mežica na spletu Local information portal

Populated places in the Municipality of Mežica
Cities and towns in Carinthia (Slovenia)